James Sanderson (29 January 1852 – 1930) was a Scottish international rugby union player. He played as a full back.

His parents James Sanderson and Eliza Ross were from Dunbar, East Lothian. James Lyon Playfair Sanderson was born in St. George's, Madras, India as his parents moved there while his father was stationed there with the Army.

He was called up to the Scotland squad for the Scotland v England match in Glasgow, on 3 March 1873. It was his only time to represent the national side.

After retiring from rugby, he moved to London to become a Haulage Contractor.

References

1852 births
1930 deaths
Scottish rugby union players
Scotland international rugby union players
History of rugby union in Scotland
Edinburgh Academicals rugby union players
Sportspeople from Chennai
Rugby union fullbacks